The 1Malaysia Housing Programme or Perumahan Rakyat 1Malaysia (PR1MA) is a housing development programme in Malaysia. It was launched on 4 July 2011 by former Prime Minister Najib Razak. It is managed by the government-owned company Perbadanan PR1MA Malaysia under the Ministry of Local Government Development. PR1MA mission is to plan, develop and provide affordable and high-quality homes inspired by modern living concepts for middle-income Malaysians.

List of PR1MA projects

Central Region
Residensi Alam Damai, Kuala Lumpur
Residensi Jalan Jubilee, Kuala Lumpur
Residensi Brickfields, Kuala Lumpur
Residensi Bandar Bukit Mahkota, Selangor
Residensi Nexus Kajang Station, Selangor
Residensi Kajang Utama, Selangor
Residensi Cyberjaya, Selangor
Residensi Cyberjaya 2, Selangor
Residensi Selangorku Lakefront Homes, Selangor

Southern Region
Residensi Seremban Sentral, Negeri Sembilan
Residensi Port Dickson, Negeri Sembilan
Residensi Rantau, Negeri Sembilan
Residensi A'Famosa, Melaka
Residensi Rumpun Bahagia, Melaka
Residensi Pulau Sebang, Melaka
Residensi Melaka Tengah 2, Melaka
Residensi Klebang 2, Melaka
Residensi Bukit Katil, Melaka
Residensi Tebrau, Johor
Residensi Bandar Layangkasa, Johor
Residensi Larkin Indah, Johor
Residensi Kota Tinggi, Johor
Residensi Pelangi Indah, Johor

Northern Region
Residensi Bandar Putra Height, Perlis
Residensi Utama, Kedah
Residensi Desa Aman, Kedah
Residensi Bandar Puteri Jaya 1, Kedah
Residensi Seri Mahkota, Kedah
Residensi Junjong, Kedah
Residensi Simpang Empat 2, Kedah
Residensi Kuala Ketil, Kedah
Residensi Pauh Permai, Penang
Residensi Kampung Paloh, Perak
Residensi Tapah, Perak
Residensi Meru, Perak
Residensi Taman Raia Sentosa, Perak
Residensi Segari, Perak
Residensi Bagan Serai, Perak
Residensi Kamunting, Perak
Residensi Kampar, Perak
Residensi Falim, Perak
Residensi Kepayang, Perak
Residensi Bandar Baru Setia Awan Perdana, Perak

East Coast Region
Residensi D'Marina, Pahang
Residensi Seri Mahkota Maju, Pahang
Residensi Gambang Baru 1, Pahang
Residensi Tok Bali, Kelantan
Residensi Lubok Jong, Kelantan
Residensi Kubang Kerian, Kelantan

Borneo Region
Residensi Ranggu, Sabah
Residensi Kota Marudu, Sabah
Residensi Menggatal, Sabah
Residensi Borneo Cove, Sabah
Residensi Elopura, Sabah
Residensi Woodford Estate, Sabah
Residensi Selatan Kinarut, Sabah
Residensi Matang Homes & Premier, Sarawak
Residensi Semenggoh, Sarawak
Residensi Bintawa Riverfront, Sarawak

External links

1Malaysia
2011 establishments in Malaysia
Prime Minister's Department (Malaysia)
Public housing in Malaysia